Ceux de la colline (Those of the Hill) is a 2009 Burkinabé documentary film.

Synopsis 
The documentary depicts an ephemeral town made up by men, women and children who all arrived with the same goal: To find gold and make it rich. The Diosso Hill, in Burkina Faso, was transformed by the presence of thousands of people, often without their families knowing that they were even there. Prospectors, dynamite blasters, retailers, prostitutes, healers, etc., all risk their lives daily, fight against themselves and amongst themselves and, finally, seem unable to leave this place set apart from time.

Awards 
 Festival International du Film Francophone de Namur (Belgium) 2009
 Brooklyn International Film Festival (USA) 2009

External links 
 
 

2009 films
Creative Commons-licensed documentary films
Burkinabé documentary films
French documentary films
Swiss documentary films
2009 documentary films
2000s French films